Yu Lina (born 1940 in Ningbo, China) is an esteemed and influential Chinese violinist pedagogue in China.

In 1959, in Shanghai, she made her debut as violinist at the nationwide celebration of the 10th anniversary of the founding of China, premiering Butterfly Lovers' Violin Concerto and hence gained great success. In the late 1970s, it gained overwhelming popularity for the second time. Her performance presented the Chinese music to the world as well as introducing the exotic western instrument, violin, to many Chinese people. The album of Butterfly Lovers' Violin Concerto presented by Yu Lina is estimated to have sold over 1 million copies worldwide. She is currently  professor of violin at Shanghai Conservatory of Music.

Her educational career spans over 50 years in China and her students occupy influential positions throughout the music world and win international competition prizes constantly. As a distinguished soloist and one of the most influential pedagogues, she motivated millions of people to study western classical music and hence influenced generations of Chinese people.

Yu Lina has made invaluable contributions to the western classical music education in China.

References

1940 births
Living people
Musicians from Ningbo
Educators from Ningbo
Chinese classical violinists
Women music educators
Women classical violinists
20th-century classical violinists
20th-century Chinese women musicians
20th-century Chinese musicians
21st-century classical violinists
21st-century Chinese women musicians
21st-century Chinese musicians